This is a list of the bird species recorded in Kenya. The avifauna of Kenya included a total of 1157 confirmed species as of October 2022. Of them, 11 are endemic, and 4 have been introduced by humans. An additional three species are considered "hypothetical" (see below) and are not included in the count. Unless otherwise noted, the list is that of Avibase.

This list's taxonomic treatment (designation and sequence of orders, families and species) and nomenclature (English and scientific names) are those of The Clements Checklist of Birds of the World, 2022 edition.

The following tags highlight several categories of occurrence other than regular migrants and non-endemic residents. The notes of population status are from the IUCN Red List of Threatened Species, and apply to the world-wide population except for endemics.

(A) Accidental - a species that rarely or accidentally occurs in Kenya (also called a vagrant)
(E) Endemic - a species endemic to Kenya
(I) Introduced - a species introduced to Kenya as a consequence, direct or indirect, of human actions
(H) Hypothetical - a species recorded but not confirmed in Kenya

Ostriches

Order: StruthioniformesFamily: Struthionidae

The ostriches are flightless birds native to Africa. They are the largest living species of bird and are distinctive in appearance, with a long neck and legs and the ability to run at high speeds.

Common ostrich, Struthio camelus
Somali ostrich, Struthio molybdophanes (Vulnerable)

Ducks, geese, and waterfowl

Order: AnseriformesFamily: Anatidae

Anatidae includes the ducks and most duck-like waterfowl, such as geese and swans. These birds are adapted to an aquatic existence with webbed feet, flattened bills, and feathers that are excellent at shedding water due to an oily coating.

White-faced whistling-duck, Dendrocygna viduata
Fulvous whistling-duck, Dendrocygna bicolor
White-backed duck, Thalassornis leuconotus
Knob-billed duck, Sarkidiornis melanotos
Egyptian goose, Alopochen aegyptiaca
Ruddy shelduck, Tadorna ferruginea (A)
Spur-winged goose, Plectropterus gambensis
African pygmy-goose, Nettapus auritus
Garganey, Spatula querquedula
Blue-billed teal, Spatula hottentota
Northern shoveler, Spatula clypeata
Gadwall, Mareca strepera
Eurasian wigeon, Mareca penelope
African black duck, Anas sparsa
Yellow-billed duck, Anas undulata
Mallard, Anas platyrhynchos
Cape teal, Anas capensis
Red-billed duck, Anas erythrorhyncha
Northern pintail, Anas acuta
Green-winged teal, Anas crecca
Southern pochard, Netta erythrophthalma
Common pochard, Aythya ferina (A) (Vulnerable)
Ferruginous duck, Aythya nyroca (Near-threatened)
Tufted duck, Aythya fuligula
Maccoa duck, Oxyura maccoa (Vulnerable)

Guineafowl

Order: GalliformesFamily: Numididae

Guineafowl are a group of African, seed-eating, ground-nesting birds that resemble partridges, but with featherless heads and spangled grey plumage.

Helmeted guineafowl, Numida meleagris
Vulturine guineafowl, Acryllium vulturinum
Eastern crested guineafowl, Guttera pucherani
Western crested guineafowl, Guttera verreauxi,

New World quail
Order: GalliformesFamily: Odontophoridae

Despite their family's common name, this species and one other are native to Africa.

Stone partridge, Ptilopachus petrosus

Pheasants, grouse, and allies

Order: GalliformesFamily: Phasianidae

The Phasianidae are a family of terrestrial birds which consists of quails, partridges, snowcocks, francolins, spurfowls, tragopans, monals, pheasants, peafowls, and jungle fowls. In general, they are plump (although they vary in size) and have broad, relatively short wings.

Crested francolin, Ortygornis sephaena
Coqui francolin, Campocolinus coqui
Ring-necked francolin, Scleroptila streptophora (Near-threatened)
Red-winged francolin, Scleroptila levaillantii
Elgon francolin, Scleroptila elgonensis
Orange River francolin, Scleroptila guttturalis
Shelley's francolin, Scleroptila shelleyi
Blue quail, Synoicus adansonii
Common quail, Coturnix coturnix
Harlequin quail, Coturnix delegorguei
Chestnut-naped francolin, Pternistis castaneicollis
Black-fronted francolin, Pternistis atrifons (Endangered)
Jackson's francolin, Pternistis jacksoni (E)
Hildebrandt's francolin, Pternistis hildebrandti
Scaly francolin, Pternistis squamatus
Yellow-necked francolin, Pternistis leucoscepus
Red-necked francolin, Pternistis afer

Flamingos

Order: PhoenicopteriformesFamily: Phoenicopteridae

Flamingos filter-feed on shellfish and algae. Their oddly shaped beaks are specially adapted to separate mud and silt from the food they consume and, uniquely, are used upside-down.

Greater flamingo, Phoenicopterus roseus
Lesser flamingo, Phoeniconaias minor (Near-threatened)

Grebes

Order: PodicipediformesFamily: Podicipedidae

Grebes are small to medium-large freshwater diving birds. They have lobed toes and are excellent swimmers and divers. Their feet are placed far back on the body, making them quite ungainly on land.

Little grebe, Tachybaptus ruficollis
Great crested grebe, Podiceps cristatus
Eared grebe, Podiceps nigricollis

Pigeons and doves

Order: ColumbiformesFamily: Columbidae

Pigeons and doves are stout-bodied birds with short necks and short slender bills with a fleshy cere.

Rock pigeon, Columba livia 
Speckled pigeon, Columba guinea
Rameron pigeon, Columba arquatrix
Delegorgue's pigeon, Columba delegorguei
Lemon dove, Columba larvata
European turtle-dove, Streptopelia turtur (A) (Vulnerable)
Dusky turtle-dove, Streptopelia lugens
White-winged collared-dove, Streptopelia reichenowi (Near-threatened)
Mourning collared-dove, Streptopelia decipiens
Red-eyed dove, Streptopelia semitorquata
Ring-necked dove, Streptopelia capicola
Laughing dove, Streptopelia senegalensis
Emerald-spotted wood-dove, Turtur chalcospilos
Blue-spotted wood-dove, Turtur afer
Tambourine dove, Turtur tympanistria
Namaqua dove, Oena capensis
Bruce's green-pigeon, Treron waalia
African green-pigeon, Treron calvus

Sandgrouse

Order: PterocliformesFamily: Pteroclidae

Sandgrouse have small, pigeon-like heads and necks, but sturdy compact bodies. They have long pointed wings and sometimes tails and a fast direct flight. Flocks fly to watering holes at dawn and dusk. Their legs are feathered down to the toes.

Chestnut-bellied sandgrouse, Pterocles exustus
Yellow-throated sandgrouse, Pterocles gutturalis
Black-faced sandgrouse, Pterocles decoratus
Lichtenstein's sandgrouse, Pterocles lichtensteinii
Four-banded sandgrouse, Pterocles quadricinctus

Bustards

Order: OtidiformesFamily: Otididae

Bustards are large terrestrial birds mainly associated with dry open country and steppes in the Old World. They are omnivorous and nest on the ground. They walk steadily on strong legs and big toes, pecking for food as they go. They have long broad wings with "fingered" wingtips and striking patterns in flight. Many have interesting mating displays.

Arabian bustard, Ardeotis arabs (A) (Near-threatened)
Kori bustard, Ardeotis kori (Near-threatened)
Denham's bustard, Neotis denhami (Near-threatened)
Heuglin's bustard, Neotis heuglinii
White-bellied bustard, Eupodotis senegalensis
Buff-crested bustard, Lophotis gindiana
Black-bellied bustard, Lissotis melanogaster
Hartlaub's bustard, Lissotis hartlaubii

Turacos

Order: MusophagiformesFamily: Musophagidae

The turacos, plantain eaters, and go-away-birds make up the family Musophagidae. They are medium-sized arboreal birds. The turacos and plantain-eaters are brightly colored, usually blue, green, or purple. The go-away-birds are mostly gray and white.

Great blue turaco, Corythaeola cristata
Schalow's turaco, Tauraco schalowi
Black-billed turaco, Tauraco schuettii
White-crested turaco, Tauraco leucolophus
Fischer's turaco, Tauraco fischeri (Near-threatened)
Hartlaub's turaco, Tauraco hartlaubi
Purple-crested turaco, Tauraco porphyreolophus
Ross's turaco, Musophaga rossae
Bare-faced go-away-bird, Corythaixoides personatus
White-bellied go-away-bird, Corythaixoides leucogaster
Eastern plantain-eater, Crinifer zonurus

Cuckoos

Order: CuculiformesFamily: Cuculidae

The family Cuculidae includes cuckoos, roadrunners, and anis. These birds are of variable size with slender bodies, long tails, and strong legs. The Old World cuckoos are brood parasites.

Senegal coucal, Centropus senegalensis
Blue-headed coucal, Centropus monachus
White-browed coucal, Centropus superciliosus
Black coucal, Centropus grillii
Blue malkoha, Ceuthmochares aereus
Green malkoha, Ceuthmochares australis
Great spotted cuckoo, Clamator glandarius
Levaillant's cuckoo, Clamator levaillantii
Pied cuckoo, Clamator jacobinus
Thick-billed cuckoo, Pachycoccyx audeberti
Dideric cuckoo, Chrysococcyx caprius
Klaas's cuckoo, Chrysococcyx klaas
African emerald cuckoo, Chrysococcyx cupreus
Barred long-tailed cuckoo, Cercococcyx montanus
Black cuckoo, Cuculus clamosus
Red-chested cuckoo, Cuculus solitarius
Lesser cuckoo, Cuculus poliocephalus
African cuckoo, Cuculus gularis
Madagascar cuckoo, Cuculus rochii
Common cuckoo, Cuculus canorus

Nightjars and allies
Order: CaprimulgiformesFamily: Caprimulgidae

Nightjars are medium-sized nocturnal birds that usually nest on the ground. They have long wings, short legs, and very short bills. Most have small feet, of little use for walking, and long pointed wings. Their soft plumage is camouflaged to resemble bark or leaves.

Pennant-winged nightjar, Caprimulgus vexillarius
Standard-winged nightjar, Caprimulgus longipennis
Eurasian nightjar, Caprimulgus europaeus
Sombre nightjar, Caprimulgus fraenatus
Nubian nightjar, Caprimulgus nubicus
Donaldson-Smith's nightjar, Caprimulgus donaldsoni
Fiery-necked nightjar, Caprimulgus pectoralis
Montane nightjar, Caprimulgus poliocephalus
Swamp nightjar, Caprimulgus natalensis
Plain nightjar, Caprimulgus inornatus
Star-spotted nightjar, Caprimulgus stellatus
Freckled nightjar, Caprimulgus tristigma
Long-tailed nightjar, Caprimulgus climacurus (A)
Slender-tailed nightjar, Caprimulgus clarus
Square-tailed nightjar, Caprimulgus fossii

Swifts

Order: CaprimulgiformesFamily: Apodidae

Swifts are small birds which spend the majority of their lives flying. They have very short legs and never settle voluntarily on the ground, perching instead only on vertical surfaces. Many swifts have long swept-back wings which resemble a crescent or boomerang.

Mottled spinetail, Telacanthura ussheri
Sabine's spinetail, Rhaphidura sabini
Bat-like spinetail, Neafrapus boehmi (A)
Scarce swift, Schoutedenapus myoptilus
Alpine swift, Apus melba
Mottled swift, Apus aequatorialis
Common swift, Apus apus
Nyanza swift, Apus niansae
African swift, Apus barbatus
Forbes-Watson's swift, Apus berliozi
Little swift, Apus affinis
Horus swift, Apus horus
White-rumped swift, Apus caffer
African palm-swift, Cypsiurus parvus

Flufftails
Order: GruiformesFamily: Sarothruridae

The flufftails are a small family of ground-dwelling birds found only in Madagascar and sub-Saharan Africa.

White-spotted flufftail, Sarothrura pulchra
Buff-spotted flufftail, Sarothrura elegans
Red-chested flufftail, Sarothrura rufa
Streaky-breasted flufftail, Sarothrura boehmi
Striped flufftail, Sarothrura affinis

Rails, gallinules, and coots

Order: GruiformesFamily: Rallidae

Rallidae is a large family of small to medium-sized birds which includes the rails, crakes, coots, and gallinules. Typically they inhabit dense vegetation in damp environments near lakes, swamps, or rivers. In general they are shy and secretive birds, making them difficult to observe. Most species have strong legs and long toes which are well adapted to soft uneven surfaces. They tend to have short, rounded wings and to be weak fliers.

African rail, Rallus caerulescens
Corn crake, Crex crex
African crake, Crex egregia
Spotted crake, Porzana porzana
Lesser moorhen, Paragallinula angulata
Eurasian moorhen, Gallinula chloropus
Red-knobbed coot, Fulica cristata
Allen's gallinule, Porphyrio alleni
African swamphen, Porphyrio madagascariensis
Striped crake, Amaurornis marginalis
Black crake, Zapornia flavirostra
Little crake, Zapornia parva (H)
Baillon's crake, Zapornia pusilla

Finfoots

Order: GruiformesFamily: Heliornithidae

Heliornithidae is a small family of tropical birds with webbed lobes on their feet similar to those of grebes and coots.

African finfoot, Podica senegalensis

Cranes

Order: GruiformesFamily: Gruidae

Cranes are large, long-legged, and long-necked birds. Unlike the similar-looking but unrelated herons, cranes fly with necks outstretched, not pulled back. Most have elaborate and noisy courting displays or "dances".

Gray crowned-crane, Balearica regulorum (Endangered)
Black crowned-crane, Balearica pavonina (Vulnerable)
Demoiselle crane, Anthropoides virgo (A)
Common crane, Grus grus (A)

Thick-knees

Order: CharadriiformesFamily: Burhinidae

The thick-knees are a group of waders found worldwide within the tropical zone, with some species also breeding in temperate Europe and Australia. They are medium to large waders with strong black or yellow-black bills, large yellow eyes, and cryptic plumage. Despite being classed as waders, most species have a preference for arid or semi-arid habitats.

Water thick-knee, Burhinus vermiculatus
Eurasian thick-knee, Burhinus oedicnemus (A)
Senegal thick-knee, Burhinus senegalensis
Spotted thick-knee, Burhinus capensis

Egyptian plover

Order: CharadriiformesFamily: Pluvianidae

The Egyptian plover is found across equatorial Africa and along the Nile River.

Egyptian plover, Pluvianus aegyptius (A)

Stilts and avocets
Order: CharadriiformesFamily: Recurvirostridae

Recurvirostridae is a family of large wading birds which includes the avocets and stilts. The avocets have long legs and long up-curved bills. The stilts have extremely long legs and long, thin, straight bills.

Black-winged stilt, Himantopus himantopus
Pied avocet, Recurvirostra avosetta

Oystercatchers
Order: CharadriiformesFamily: Haematopodidae

The oystercatchers are large and noisy plover-like birds, with strong bills used for smashing or prising open molluscs.

Eurasian oystercatcher, Haematopus ostralegus

Plovers and lapwings

Order: CharadriiformesFamily: Charadriidae

The family Charadriidae includes the plovers, dotterels, and lapwings. They are small to medium-sized birds with compact bodies, short thick necks, and long, usually pointed, wings. They are found in open country worldwide, mostly in habitats near water.

Black-bellied plover, Pluvialis squatarola
Pacific golden-plover, Pluvialis fulva
Northern lapwing, Vanellus vanellus (A) (Near-threatened)
Long-toed lapwing, Vanellus crassirostris
Blacksmith lapwing, Vanellus armatus
Spur-winged lapwing, Vanellus spinosus
Black-headed lapwing, Vanellus tectus
Senegal lapwing, Vanellus lugubris
Black-winged lapwing, Vanellus melanopterus
Crowned lapwing, Vanellus coronatus
Wattled lapwing, Vanellus senegallus
Brown-chested lapwing, Vanellus superciliosus (A)
Lesser sand-plover, Charadrius mongolus
Greater sand-plover, Charadrius leschenaultii
Caspian plover, Charadrius asiaticus
Kittlitz's plover, Charadrius pecuarius
Kentish plover, Charadrius alexandrinus
Common ringed plover, Charadrius hiaticula
Little ringed plover, Charadrius dubius
Three-banded plover, Charadrius tricollaris
White-fronted plover, Charadrius marginatus
Chestnut-banded plover, Charadrius pallidus (Near-threatened)

Painted-snipes

Order: CharadriiformesFamily: Rostratulidae

Painted-snipes are short-legged, long-billed birds similar in shape to the true snipes, but more brightly colored.

Greater painted-snipe, Rostratula benghalensis

Jacanas

Order: CharadriiformesFamily: Jacanidae

The jacanas are a family of waders that are found throughout the tropics. They are identifiable by their huge feet and claws which enable them to walk on floating vegetation in the shallow lakes that are their preferred habitat.

Lesser jacana, Microparra capensis
African jacana, Actophilornis africanus

Sandpipers and allies

Order: CharadriiformesFamily: Scolopacidae

Scolopacidae is a large diverse family of small to medium-sized shorebirds including the sandpipers, curlews, godwits, shanks, tattlers, woodcocks, snipes, dowitchers, and phalaropes. The majority of these species eat small invertebrates picked out of the mud or soil. Variation in length of legs and bills enables multiple species to feed in the same habitat, particularly on the coast, without direct competition for food.

Whimbrel, Numenius phaeopus
Eurasian curlew, Numenius arquata (Near-threatened)
Bar-tailed godwit, Limosa lapponica (Near-threatened)
Black-tailed godwit, Limosa limosa (Near-threatened)
Ruddy turnstone, Arenaria interpres
Red knot, Calidris canutus (A) (Near-threatened)
Ruff, Calidris pugnax
Broad-billed sandpiper, Calidris falcinellus
Curlew sandpiper, Calidris ferruginea (Near-threatened)
Temminck's stint, Calidris temminckii
Long-toed stint, Calidris subminuta (A)
Red-necked stint, Calidris ruficollis (A) (Near-threatened)
Sanderling, Calidris alba
Dunlin, Calidris alpina (A)
Little stint, Calidris minuta
Buff-breasted sandpiper, Calidris subruficollis (A) (Near-threatened)
Pectoral sandpiper, Calidris melanotos (A)
Jack snipe, Lymnocryptes minimus
Great snipe, Gallinago media (Near-threatened)
Common snipe, Gallinago gallinago
Pin-tailed snipe, Gallinago stenura (A)
African snipe, Gallinago nigripennis
Terek sandpiper, Xenus cinereus
Red-necked phalarope, Phalaropus lobatus
Red phalarope, Phalaropus fulicarius (A)
Common sandpiper, Actitis hypoleucos
Spotted sandpiper, Actitis macularius (A)
Green sandpiper, Tringa ochropus
Spotted redshank, Tringa erythropus
Common greenshank, Tringa nebularia
Marsh sandpiper, Tringa stagnatilis
Wood sandpiper, Tringa glareola
Common redshank, Tringa totanus

Buttonquails
Order: CharadriiformesFamily: Turnicidae

The buttonquails are small, drab, running birds which resemble the true quails. The female is the brighter of the sexes and initiates courtship. The male incubates the eggs and tends the young.

Small buttonquail, Turnix sylvaticus
Black-rumped buttonquail, Turnix nanus
Quail-plover, Ortyxelos meiffrenii

Crab-plover
Order: CharadriiformesFamily: Dromadidae

The crab-plover is related to the waders. It resembles a plover but with very long grey legs and a strong heavy black bill similar to a tern's. It has black-and-white plumage, a long neck, partially webbed feet, and a bill designed for eating crabs.

Crab-plover, Dromas ardeola

Pratincoles and coursers
Order: CharadriiformesFamily: Glareolidae

Glareolidae is a family of wading birds comprising the pratincoles, which have short legs, long pointed wings, and long forked tails, and the coursers, which have long legs, short wings, and long, pointed bills which curve downwards.

Cream-colored courser, Cursorius cursor (A)
Somali courser, Cursorius somalensis
Temminck's courser, Cursorius temminckii
Double-banded courser, Smutsornis africanus
Three-banded courser, Rhinoptilus cinctus
Bronze-winged courser, Rhinoptilus chalcopterus
Collared pratincole, Glareola pratincola
Black-winged pratincole, Glareola nordmanni (A) (Near-threatened)
Madagascar pratincole, Glareola ocularis (Vulnerable)
Rock pratincole, Glareola nuchalis

Skuas and jaegers

Order: CharadriiformesFamily: Stercorariidae

The family Stercorariidae are, in general, medium to large birds, typically with grey or brown plumage, often with white markings on the wings. They nest on the ground in temperate and arctic regions and are long-distance migrants.

Pomarine jaeger, Stercorarius pomarinus
Parasitic jaeger, Stercorarius parasiticus (A)
Long-tailed jaeger, Stercorarius longicaudus (A)

Gulls, terns, and skimmers

Order: CharadriiformesFamily: Laridae

Laridae is a family of medium to large seabirds, the gulls, kittiwakes, terns, and skimmers. Gulls are typically gray or white, often with black markings on the head or wings. They have stout, longish bills and webbed feet. Terns are a group of generally medium to large seabirds typically with gray or white plumage, often with black markings on the head. Most terns hunt fish by diving but some pick insects off the surface of fresh water. Terns are generally long-lived birds, with several species known to live in excess of 30 years. Skimmers are a small family of tropical tern-like birds. They have an elongated lower mandible which they use to feed by flying low over the water surface and skimming the water for small fish.

Slender-billed gull, Chroicocephalus genei
Gray-hooded gull, Chroicocephalus cirrocephalus
Black-headed gull, Chroicocephalus ridibundus
Little gull, Hydrocoloeus minutus (A)
Mediterranean gull, Ichthyaetus melanocephalus (A)
White-eyed gull, Ichthyaetus leucophthalmus (A)
Sooty gull, Ichthyaetus hemprichii
Pallas's gull, Ichthyaetus ichthyaetus
Common gull, Larus canus (A)
Lesser black-backed gull, Larus fuscus
Kelp gull, Larus dominicanus (A)
Brown noddy, Anous stolidus
Lesser noddy, Anous tenuirostris (A)
Sooty tern, Onychoprion fuscatus
Bridled tern, Onychoprion anaethetus
Little tern, Sternula albifrons (A)
Saunders's tern, Sternula saundersi
Gull-billed tern, Gelochelidon nilotica
Caspian tern, Hydroprogne caspia
Black tern, Chlidonias niger (A)
White-winged tern, Chlidonias leucopterus
Whiskered tern, Chlidonias hybrida
Roseate tern, Sterna dougallii
Common tern, Sterna hirundo
Arctic tern, Sterna paradisaea (A)
White-cheeked tern, Sterna repressa
Great crested tern, Thalasseus bergii
Sandwich tern, Thalasseus sandvicensis
Lesser crested tern, Thalasseus bengalensis
African skimmer, Rynchops flavirostris (Near-threatened)

Tropicbirds
Order: PhaethontiformesFamily: Phaethontidae

Tropicbirds are slender white birds of tropical oceans, with exceptionally long central tail feathers. Their heads and long wings have black markings.

White-tailed tropicbird, Phaethon lepturus
Red-tailed tropicbird, Phaethon rubricauda (A)

Albatrosses
Order: ProcellariiformesFamily: Diomedeidae

The albatrosses are among the largest of flying birds, and the great albatrosses of the genus Diomedea have the largest wingspans of any extant birds.

White-capped albatross, Thalassarche cauta (A)
Black-browed albatross, Thalassarche melanophris (A)

Southern storm-petrels
Order: ProcellariiformesFamily: Oceanitidae

The storm-petrels are the smallest seabirds, relatives of the petrels, feeding on planktonic crustaceans and small fish picked from the surface, typically while hovering. The flight is fluttering and sometimes bat-like. Until 2018, this family's species were included with the other storm-petrels in family Hydrobatidae.

Wilson's storm-petrel, Oceanites oceanicus
Black-bellied storm-petrel, Fregetta tropica (A)

Northern storm-petrels
Order: ProcellariiformesFamily: Hydrobatidae

Though the members of this family are similar in many respects to the southern storm-petrels, including their general appearance and habits, there are enough genetic differences to warrant their placement in a separate family.

Leach's storm-petrel, Hydrobates leucorhous (A) (Vulnerable)
Matsudaira's storm-petrel, Hydrobates matsudairae (A) (Vulnerable)

Shearwaters and petrels

Order: ProcellariiformesFamily: Procellariidae

The procellariids are the main group of medium-sized "true petrels", characterised by united nostrils with medium septum and a long outer functional primary.

Southern giant-petrel, Macronectes giganteus (H)
Cape petrel, Daption capense (A)
Antarctic prion, Pachyptila desolata (A)
Slender-billed prion, Pachyptila belcheri (A)
Jouanin's petrel, Bulweria fallax (A) (Near-threatened)
White-chinned petrel, Procellaria aequinoctialis (A) (Vulnerable)
Wedge-tailed shearwater, Ardenna pacifica (A)
Sooty shearwater, Ardenna grisea (A) (Near-threatened)
Tropical shearwater, Puffinus bailloni
Persian shearwater, Puffinus persicus (A)

Storks

Order: CiconiiformesFamily: Ciconiidae

Storks are large, long-legged, long-necked wading birds with long, stout bills. Storks are mute, but bill-clattering is an important mode of communication at the nest. Their nests can be large and may be reused for many years. Many species are migratory.

African openbill, Anastomus lamelligerus
Black stork, Ciconia nigra
Abdim's stork, Ciconia abdimii
African woolly-necked stork, Ciconia microscelis
White stork, Ciconia ciconia
Saddle-billed stork, Ephippiorhynchus senegalensis
Marabou stork, Leptoptilos crumenifer
Yellow-billed stork, Mycteria ibis

Frigatebirds

Order: SuliformesFamily: Fregatidae

Frigatebirds are large seabirds usually found over tropical oceans. They are large, black-and-white, or completely black, with long wings and deeply forked tails. The males have colored inflatable throat pouches. They do not swim or walk and cannot take off from a flat surface. Having the largest wingspan-to-body-weight ratio of any bird, they are essentially aerial, able to stay aloft for more than a week.

Lesser frigatebird, Fregata ariel (A)
Christmas Island frigatebird, Fregata andrewsi (A)
Great frigatebird, Fregata minor (A)

Boobies and gannets
Order: SuliformesFamily: Sulidae

The sulids comprise the gannets and boobies. Both groups are medium to large coastal seabirds that plunge-dive for fish.

Masked booby, Sula dactylatra
Brown booby, Sula leucogaster 
Red-footed booby, Sula sula (A)

Anhingas

Order: SuliformesFamily: Anhingidae

Anhingas or darters are often called "snake-birds" because of their long thin neck, which gives a snake-like appearance when they swim with their bodies submerged. The males have black and dark-brown plumage, an erectile crest on the nape, and a larger bill than the female. The females have much paler plumage especially on the neck and underparts. The darters have completely webbed feet and their legs are short and set far back on the body. Their plumage is somewhat permeable, like that of cormorants, and they spread their wings to dry after diving.

African darter, Anhinga rufa

Cormorants and shags

Order: SuliformesFamily: Phalacrocoracidae

Phalacrocoracidae is a family of medium to large coastal, fish-eating seabirds that includes cormorants and shags. Plumage coloration varies, with the majority having mainly dark plumage, some species being black-and-white, and a few being colorful.

Long-tailed cormorant, Microcarbo africanus
Great cormorant, Phalacrocorax carbo

Pelicans

Order: PelecaniformesFamily: Pelecanidae

Pelicans are large water birds with a distinctive pouch under their beak. As with other members of the order Pelecaniformes, they have webbed feet with four toes.

Great white pelican, Pelecanus onocrotalus
Pink-backed pelican, Pelecanus rufescens

Shoebill
Order: PelecaniformesFamily: Balaenicipididae

The shoebill was formerly thought to be related to storks but is in the same order as pelicans. It derives its name from its massive shoe-shaped bill.

Shoebill, Balaeniceps rex (A) (Vulnerable)

Hamerkop

Order: PelecaniformesFamily: Scopidae

The hamerkop is a medium-sized bird with a long shaggy crest. The shape of its head with a curved bill and crest at the back is reminiscent of a hammer, hence its name. Its plumage is drab-brown all over.

Hamerkop, Scopus umbretta

Herons, egrets, and bitterns

Order: PelecaniformesFamily: Ardeidae

The family Ardeidae contains the bitterns, herons, and egrets. Herons and egrets are medium to large wading birds with long necks and legs. Bitterns tend to be shorter necked and more wary. Members of Ardeidae fly with their necks retracted, unlike other long-necked birds such as storks, ibises and spoonbills.

Great bittern, Botaurus stellaris (A)
Little bittern, Ixobrychus minutus
Dwarf bittern, Ixobrychus sturmii
Gray heron, Ardea cinerea
Black-headed heron, Ardea melanocephala
Goliath heron, Ardea goliath
Purple heron, Ardea purpurea
Great egret, Ardea alba
Intermediate egret, Ardea intermedia
Little egret, Egretta garzetta
Western reef-heron, Egretta gularis
Black heron, Egretta ardesiaca
Cattle egret, Bubulcus ibis
Squacco heron, Ardeola ralloides
Malagasy pond-heron, Ardeola idae (Endangered)
Rufous-bellied heron, Ardeola rufiventris
Striated heron, Butorides striata
Black-crowned night-heron, Nycticorax nycticorax
White-backed night-heron, Gorsachius leuconotus

Ibises and spoonbills

Order: PelecaniformesFamily: Threskiornithidae

Threskiornithidae is a family of large terrestrial and wading birds which includes the ibises and spoonbills. They have long, broad wings with 11 primary and about 20 secondary feathers. They are strong fliers and despite their size and weight, very capable soarers.

Glossy ibis, Plegadis falcinellus
African sacred ibis, Threskiornis aethiopicus
Olive ibis, Bostrychia olivacea
Hadada ibis, Bostrychia hagedash
Eurasian spoonbill, Platalea leucorodia
African spoonbill, Platalea alba

Secretarybird
Order: AccipitriformesFamily: Sagittariidae

The secretary-bird is a bird of prey but is easily distinguished from other raptors by its long crane-like legs.

Secretarybird, Sagittarius serpentarius (Endangered)

Osprey
Order: AccipitriformesFamily: Pandionidae

The family Pandionidae contains only one species, the osprey. The osprey is a medium-large raptor which is a specialist fish-eater with a worldwide distribution.

Osprey, Pandion haliaetus

Hawks, eagles, and kites

Order: AccipitriformesFamily: Accipitridae

Accipitridae is a family of birds of prey which includes hawks, eagles, kites, harriers, and Old World vultures. These birds have powerful hooked beaks for tearing flesh from their prey, strong legs, powerful talons, and keen eyesight.

Black-winged kite, Elanus caeruleus
Scissor-tailed kite, Chelictinia riocourii
African harrier-hawk, Polyboroides typus
Palm-nut vulture, Gypohierax angolensis
Bearded vulture, Gypaetus barbatus (Near-threatened)
Egyptian vulture, Neophron percnopterus (Endangered)
European honey-buzzard, Pernis apivorus
Oriental honey-buzzard, Pernis ptilorhynchus (A)
African cuckoo-hawk, Aviceda cuculoides
White-headed vulture, Trigonoceps occipitalis (Critically endangered)
Lappet-faced vulture, Torgos tracheliotus (Endangered)
Hooded vulture, Necrosyrtes monachus (Critically endangered)
White-backed vulture, Gyps africanus (Critically endangered)
Rüppell's griffon, Gyps rueppelli (Critically endangered)
Eurasian griffon, Gyps fulvus (A)
Bateleur, Terathopius ecaudatus (Endangered)
Short-toed snake-eagle, Circaetus gallicus (A)
Beaudouin's snake-eagle, Circaetus beaudouini (Vulnerable)
Black-chested snake-eagle, Circaetus pectoralis
Brown snake-eagle, Circaetus cinereus
Fasciated snake-eagle, Circaetus fasciolatus (Near-threatened)
Banded snake-eagle, Circaetus cinerascens
Bat hawk, Macheiramphus alcinus
Crowned eagle, Stephanoaetus coronatus (Near-threatened)
Martial eagle, Polemaetus bellicosus (Endangered)
Long-crested eagle, Lophaetus occipitalis
Lesser spotted eagle, Clanga pomarina
Greater spotted eagle, Clanga clanga (A) (Vulnerable)
Wahlberg's eagle, Hieraaetus wahlbergi
Booted eagle, Hieraaetus pennatus
Ayres's hawk-eagle, Hieraaetus ayresii
Tawny eagle, Aquila rapax (Vulnerable)
Steppe eagle, Aquila nipalensis (Endangered)
Imperial eagle, Aquila heliaca (Vulnerable)
Cassin's hawk-eagle, Aquila africana (A)
Verreaux's eagle, Aquila verreauxii
African hawk-eagle, Aquila spilogaster
Lizard buzzard, Kaupifalco monogrammicus
Dark chanting-goshawk, Melierax metabates
Eastern chanting-goshawk, Melierax poliopterus
Gabar goshawk, Micronisus gabar
Grasshopper buzzard, Butastur rufipennis
Eurasian marsh-harrier, Circus aeruginosus
African marsh-harrier, Circus ranivorus
Pallid harrier, Circus macrourus (Near-threatened)
Montagu's harrier, Circus pygargus
African goshawk, Accipiter tachiro
Shikra, Accipiter badius
Levant sparrowhawk, Accipiter brevipes (A)
Little sparrowhawk, Accipiter minullus
Ovambo sparrowhawk, Accipiter ovampensis
Eurasian sparrowhawk, Accipiter nisus (A)
Rufous-breasted sparrowhawk, Accipiter rufiventris
Black goshawk, Accipiter melanoleucus
Black kite, Milvus migrans
African fish-eagle, Haliaeetus vocifer
Common buzzard, Buteo buteo
Mountain buzzard, Buteo oreophilus (Near-threatened)
Long-legged buzzard, Buteo rufinus
Augur buzzard, Buteo augur

Barn-owls
Order: StrigiformesFamily: Tytonidae

Barn-owls are medium to large owls with large heads and characteristic heart-shaped faces. They have long strong legs with powerful talons.

African grass-owl, Tyto capensis
Barn owl, Tyto alba

Owls

Order: StrigiformesFamily: Strigidae

The typical owls are small to large solitary nocturnal birds of prey. They have large forward-facing eyes and ears, a hawk-like beak, and a conspicuous circle of feathers around each eye called a facial disk. 

Sokoke scops-owl, Otus ireneae (Endangered)
Eurasian scops-owl, Otus scops
African scops-owl, Otus senegalensis
Northern white-faced owl, Ptilopsis leucotis
Southern white-faced owl, Ptilopsis granti
Cape eagle-owl, Bubo capensis
Spotted eagle-owl, Bubo africanus
Grayish eagle-owl, Bubo cinerascens
Verreaux's eagle-owl, Bubo lacteus
Pel's fishing-owl, Scotopelia peli
Pearl-spotted owlet, Glaucidium perlatum
Red-chested owlet, Glaucidium tephronotum
African barred owlet, Glaucidium capense
African wood-owl, Strix woodfordii
Abyssinian owl, Asio abyssinicus
Short-eared owl, Asio flammeus (A)
Marsh owl, Asio capensis

Mousebirds

Order: ColiiformesFamily: Coliidae

The mousebirds are slender grayish or brown birds with soft, hairlike body feathers and very long thin tails. They are arboreal and scurry through the leaves like rodents in search of berries, fruit, and buds. They are acrobatic and can feed upside down. All species have strong claws and reversible outer toes. They also have crests and stubby bills.

Speckled mousebird, Colius striatus
White-headed mousebird, Colius leucocephalus
Blue-naped mousebird, Urocolius macrourus

Trogons

Order: TrogoniformesFamily: Trogonidae

The family Trogonidae includes trogons and quetzals. Found in tropical woodlands worldwide, they feed on insects and fruit, and their broad bills and weak legs reflect their diet and arboreal habits. Although their flight is fast, they are reluctant to fly any distance. Trogons have soft, often colorful, feathers with distinctive male and female plumage.

Narina trogon, Apaloderma narina
Bar-tailed trogon, Apaloderma vittatum

Hoopoes
Order: BucerotiformesFamily: Upupidae

Hoopoes have black, white, and orangey-pink coloring with a large erectile crest on their head.

Eurasian hoopoe, Upupa epops

Woodhoopoes and scimitarbills

Order: BucerotiformesFamily: Phoeniculidae

The woodhoopoes and scimitarbills are related to the hoopoes, ground-hornbills, and hornbills. They most resemble the hoopoes with their long curved bills, used to probe for insects, and short rounded wings. However, they differ in that they have metallic plumage, often blue, green, or purple, and lack an erectile crest.

Green woodhoopoe, Phoeniculus purpureus
Violet woodhoopoe, Phoeniculus damarensis
Black-billed woodhoopoe, Phoeniculus somaliensis
White-headed woodhoopoe, Phoeniculus bollei
Common scimitarbill, Rhinopomastus cyanomelas
Abyssinian scimitarbill, Rhinopomastus minor

Ground-hornbills
Order: BucerotiformesFamily: Bucorvidae

The ground-hornbills are terrestrial birds which feed almost entirely on insects, other birds, snakes, and amphibians.

Abyssinian ground-hornbill, Bucorvus abyssinicus (Vulnerable)
Southern ground-hornbill, Bucorvus leadbeateri (Vulnerable)

Hornbills

Order: BucerotiformesFamily: Bucerotidae

Hornbills are a group of birds whose bill is shaped like a cow's horn, but without a twist, sometimes with a casque on the upper mandible. Frequently, the bill is brightly colored.

Crowned hornbill, Lophoceros alboterminatus
Hemprich's hornbill, Lophoceros hemprichii
African gray hornbill, Lophoceros nasutus
Eastern yellow-billed hornbill, Tockus flavirostris
Jackson's hornbill, Tockus jacksoni
Von der Decken's hornbill, Tockus deckeni
Northern red-billed hornbill, Tockus erythrorhynchus
Silvery-cheeked hornbill, Bycanistes brevis
Black-and-white-casqued hornbill, Bycanistes subcylindricus
Trumpeter hornbill, Bycanistes bucinator

Kingfishers

Order: CoraciiformesFamily: Alcedinidae

Kingfishers are medium-sized birds with large heads, long, pointed bills, short legs, and stubby tails.

Half-collared kingfisher, Alcedo semitorquata
Shining-blue kingfisher, Alcedo quadribrachys
Malachite kingfisher, Corythornis cristatus
African pygmy kingfisher, Ispidina picta
Gray-headed kingfisher, Halcyon leucocephala
Woodland kingfisher, Halcyon senegalensis
Mangrove kingfisher, Halcyon senegaloides
Blue-breasted kingfisher, Halcyon malimbica (A)
Brown-hooded kingfisher, Halcyon albiventris
Striped kingfisher, Halcyon chelicuti
Collared kingfisher, Todiramphus chloris
Giant kingfisher, Megaceryle maxima
Pied kingfisher, Ceryle rudis

Bee-eaters

Order: CoraciiformesFamily: Meropidae

The bee-eaters are a group of near passerine birds in the family Meropidae. Most species are found in Africa but others occur in southern Europe, Madagascar, Australia, and New Guinea. They are characterised by richly colored plumage, slender bodies, and usually elongated central tail feathers. All have long down-turned bills and pointed wings, which give them a swallow-like appearance when seen from afar.

Blue-headed bee-eater, Merops muelleri
White-fronted bee-eater, Merops bullockoides
Little bee-eater, Merops pusillus
Blue-breasted bee-eater, Merops variegatus
Cinnamon-chested bee-eater, Merops oreobates
Swallow-tailed bee-eater, Merops hirundineus (A)
Somali bee-eater, Merops revoilii
White-throated bee-eater, Merops albicollis
Blue-cheeked bee-eater, Merops persicus
Madagascar bee-eater, Merops superciliosus
European bee-eater, Merops apiaster
Northern carmine bee-eater, Merops nubicus
Southern carmine bee-eater, Merops nubicoides (A)

Rollers

Order: CoraciiformesFamily: Coraciidae

Rollers resemble crows in size and build, but are more closely related to the kingfishers and bee-eaters. They share the colorful appearance of those groups with blues and browns predominating. The two inner front toes are connected, but the outer toe is not.

European roller, Coracias garrulus
Abyssinian roller, Coracias abyssinicus
Lilac-breasted roller, Coracias caudatus
Racket-tailed roller, Coracias spatulatus (A)
Rufous-crowned roller, Coracias naevius
Broad-billed roller, Eurystomus glaucurus

African barbets

Order: PiciformesFamily: Lybiidae

The barbets are plump birds, with short necks and large heads. They get their name from the bristles which fringe their heavy bills. Most species are brightly colored.

Yellow-billed barbet, Trachyphonus purpuratus
Red-and-yellow barbet, Trachyphonus erythrocephalus
D'Arnaud's barbet, Trachyphonus darnaudii
Gray-throated barbet, Gymnobucco bonapartei
White-eared barbet, Stactolaema leucotis
Green barbet, Stactolaema olivacea
Green tinkerbird, Pogoniulus simplex
Moustached tinkerbird, Pogoniulus leucomystax
Yellow-rumped tinkerbird, Pogoniulus bilineatus
Red-fronted tinkerbird, Pogoniulus pusillus
Yellow-fronted tinkerbird, Pogoniulus chrysoconus
Yellow-spotted barbet, Buccanodon duchaillui
Hairy-breasted barbet, Tricholaema hirsuta
Red-fronted barbet, Tricholaema diademata
Spot-flanked barbet, Tricholaema lachrymosa
Black-throated barbet, Tricholaema melanocephala
White-headed barbet, Lybius leucocephalus
Black-billed barbet, Lybius guifsobalito
Black-collared barbet, Lybius torquatus
Brown-breasted barbet, Lybius melanopterus
Double-toothed barbet, Lybius bidentatus

Honeyguides
Order: PiciformesFamily: Indicatoridae

Honeyguides are among the few birds that feed on wax. They are named for the greater honeyguide which leads traditional honey-hunters to bees' nests and, after the hunters have harvested the honey, feeds on the remaining contents of the hive.

Cassin's honeyguide, Prodotiscus insignis
Green-backed honeyguide, Prodotiscus zambesiae
Wahlberg's honeyguide, Prodotiscus regulus
Pallid honeyguide, Indicator meliphilus
Least honeyguide, Indicator exilis
Lesser honeyguide, Indicator minor
Scaly-throated honeyguide, Indicator variegatus
Greater honeyguide, Indicator indicator

Woodpeckers

Order: PiciformesFamily: Picidae

Woodpeckers are small to medium-sized birds with chisel-like beaks, short legs, stiff tails, and long tongues used for capturing insects. Some species have feet with two toes pointing forward and two backward, while several species have only three toes. Many woodpeckers have the habit of tapping noisily on tree trunks with their beaks.

Eurasian wryneck, Jynx torquilla (A)
Rufous-necked wryneck, Jynx ruficollis
Speckle-breasted woodpecker, Chloropicus poecilolaemus
Cardinal woodpecker, Chloropicus fuscescens
Bearded woodpecker, Chloropicus namaquus
Golden-crowned woodpecker, Chloropicus xantholophus
Brown-backed woodpecker, Chloropicus obsoletus
African gray woodpecker, Chloropicus goertae
Mountain gray woodpecker, Chloropicus spodocephalus
Brown-eared woodpecker, Campethera caroli
Buff-spotted woodpecker, Campethera nivosa
Tullberg's woodpecker, Campethera tullbergi
Green-backed woodpecker, Campethera cailliautii
Nubian woodpecker, Campethera nubica
Bennett's woodpecker, Campethera bennettii (A)
Reichenow's woodpecker, Campethera scriptoricauda (A)
Golden-tailed woodpecker, Campethera abingoni
Mombasa woodpecker, Campethera mombassica

Falcons and caracaras

Order: FalconiformesFamily: Falconidae

Falconidae is a family of diurnal birds of prey. They differ from hawks, eagles, and kites in that they kill with their beaks instead of their talons.

Pygmy falcon, Polihierax semitorquatus
Lesser kestrel, Falco naumanni
Eurasian kestrel, Falco tinnunculus
Rock kestrel, Falco rupicolus
Greater kestrel, Falco rupicoloides
Fox kestrel, Falco alopex
Gray kestrel, Falco ardosiaceus
Dickinson's kestrel, Falco dickinsoni
Red-necked falcon, Falco chicquera
Red-footed falcon, Falco vespertinus (Near-threatened)
Amur falcon, Falco amurensis
Eleonora's falcon, Falco eleonorae
Sooty falcon, Falco concolor (Vulnerable)
Eurasian hobby, Falco subbuteo
African hobby, Falco cuvierii
Lanner falcon, Falco biarmicus
Saker falcon, Falco cherrug (Endangered)
Peregrine falcon, Falco peregrinus
Taita falcon, Falco fasciinucha (Vulnerable)

Old World parrots
Order: PsittaciformesFamily: Psittaculidae

Characteristic features of parrots include a strong curved bill, an upright stance, strong legs, and clawed zygodactyl feet. Many parrots are vividly colored, and some are multi-colored. Old World parrots are found from Africa east across south and southeast Asia and Oceania to Australia and New Zealand.

Gray-headed lovebird, Agapornis canus (I)
Red-headed lovebird, Agapornis pullarius
Fischer's lovebird, Agapornis fischeri (Near-threatened)
Yellow-collared lovebird, Agapornis personatus (I)

African and New World parrots

Order: PsittaciformesFamily: Psittacidae

Characteristic features of parrots include a strong curved bill, an upright stance, strong legs, and clawed zygodactyl feet. Many parrots are vividly colored, and some are multi-colored. Most of the more than 150 species in this family are found in the New World.

Gray parrot, Psittacus erithacus
Red-fronted parrot, Poicephalus gulielmi
Meyer's parrot, Poicephalus meyeri
Brown-headed parrot, Poicephalus cryptoxanthus
Red-bellied parrot, Poicephalus rufiventris

African and green broadbills
Order: PasseriformesFamily: Calyptomenidae

The broadbills are small, brightly colored birds which feed on fruit and also take insects in flycatcher fashion, snapping their broad bills. Their habitat is canopies of wet forests.

African broadbill, Smithornis capensis

Pittas
Order: PasseriformesFamily: Pittidae

Pittas are medium-sized by passerine standards and are stocky, with fairly long, strong legs, short tails, and stout bills. Many are brightly colored. They spend the majority of their time on wet forest floors, eating snails, insects, and similar invertebrates.

African pitta, Pitta angolensis

Cuckooshrikes

Order: PasseriformesFamily: Campephagidae

The cuckooshrikes are small to medium-sized passerine birds. They are predominantly grayish with white and black, although some species are brightly colored.

Gray cuckooshrike, Coracina caesia
White-breasted cuckooshrike, Coracina pectoralis
Black cuckooshrike, Campephaga flava
Petit's cuckooshrike, Campephaga petiti
Red-shouldered cuckooshrike, Campephaga phoenicea
Purple-throated cuckooshrike, Campephaga quiscalina

Old World orioles
Order: PasseriformesFamily: Oriolidae

The Old World orioles are colorful passerine birds which are not related to the similar-looking New World orioles.

Eurasian golden oriole, Oriolus oriolus
African golden oriole, Oriolus auratus
Green-headed oriole, Oriolus chlorocephalus
Western black-headed oriole, Oriolus brachyrhynchus
African black-headed oriole, Oriolus larvatus
Black-tailed oriole, Oriolus percivali

Wattle-eyes and batises

Order: PasseriformesFamily: Platysteiridae

The wattle-eyes, or puffback flycatchers, are small stout passerine birds of the African tropics. They get their name from the brightly colored fleshy eye decorations found in most species in this group.

Brown-throated wattle-eye, Platysteira cyanea
Black-throated wattle-eye, Platysteira peltata
Chestnut wattle-eye, Platysteira castanea
Jameson's wattle-eye, Platysteira jamesoni
Yellow-bellied wattle-eye, Platysteira concreta
Short-tailed batis, Batis mixta
Chinspot batis, Batis molitor
Pale batis, Batis soror
Gray-headed batis, Batis orientalis (A)
Western black-headed batis, Batis erlangeri
Eastern black-headed batis, Batis minor
Pygmy batis, Batis perkeo

Vangas, helmetshrikes, and allies

Order: PasseriformesFamily: Vangidae

The helmetshrikes are similar in build to the shrikes, but tend to be colorful species with distinctive crests or other head ornaments, such as wattles, from which they get their name.

White helmetshrike, Prionops plumatus
Gray-crested helmetshrike, Prionops poliolophus (Near-threatened)
Retz's helmetshrike, Prionops retzii
Chestnut-fronted helmetshrike, Prionops scopifrons
African shrike-flycatcher, Megabyas flammulatus
Black-and-white shrike-flycatcher, Bias musicus

Bushshrikes and allies

Order: PasseriformesFamily: Malaconotidae

Bushshrikes are similar in habits to shrikes, hunting insects and other small prey from a perch on a bush. Although similar in build to the shrikes, these tend to be either colorful species or largely black; some species are quite secretive.

Brubru, Nilaus afer
Northern puffback, Dryoscopus gambensis
Pringle's puffback, Dryoscopus pringlii
Black-backed puffback, Dryoscopus cubla
Pink-footed puffback, Dryoscopus angolensis
Marsh tchagra, Tchagra minuta
Black-crowned tchagra, Tchagra senegala
Brown-crowned tchagra, Tchagra australis
Three-streaked tchagra, Tchagra jamesi
Red-naped bushshrike, Laniarius ruficeps
Coastal boubou, Laniarius nigerrimus
Lühder's bushshrike, Laniarius luehderi
Ethiopian boubou, Laniarius aethiopicus
Tropical boubou, Laniarius major    
Zanzibar boubou, Laniarius sublacteus
Black-headed gonolek, Laniarius erythrogaster
Papyrus gonolek, Laniarius mufumbiri (Near-threatened)
Slate-colored boubou, Laniarius funebris
Lowland sooty boubou, Laniarius leucorhynchus (A)
Rosy-patched bushshrike, Rhodophoneus cruentus
Gray-green bushshrike, Telophorus bocagei
Sulphur-breasted bushshrike, Telophorus sulfureopectus
Black-fronted bushshrike, Telophorus nigrifrons
Four-colored bushshrike, Telophorus viridis
Doherty's bushshrike, Telophorus dohertyi
Gray-headed bushshrike, Malaconotus blanchoti

Drongos

Order: PasseriformesFamily: Dicruridae

The drongos are mostly black or dark gray in color, sometimes with metallic tints. They have long forked tails, and some Asian species have elaborate tail decorations. They have short legs and sit very upright when perched, like a shrike. They flycatch or take prey from the ground.

Sharpe's drongo, Dicrurus sharpei
Common square-tailed drongo, Dicrurus ludwigii
Fork-tailed drongo, Dicrurus adsimilis
Glossy-backed drongo, Dicrurus divaricatus
Velvet-mantled drongo, Dicrurus modestus

Monarch flycatchers
Order: PasseriformesFamily: Monarchidae

The monarch flycatchers are small to medium-sized insectivorous passerines which hunt by flycatching.

African crested-flycatcher, Trochocercus cyanomelas
Black-headed paradise-flycatcher, Terpsiphone rufiventer
African paradise-flycatcher, Terpsiphone viridis

Shrikes

Order: PasseriformesFamily: Laniidae

Shrikes are passerine birds known for their habit of catching other birds and small animals and impaling the uneaten portions of their bodies on thorns. A shrike's beak is hooked, like that of a typical bird of prey.

Red-backed shrike, Lanius collurio
Red-tailed shrike, Lanius phoenicuroides
Isabelline shrike, Lanius isabellinus (A)
Great gray shrike, Lanius excubitor (A) 
Lesser gray shrike, Lanius minor
Gray-backed fiscal, Lanius excubitoroides
Long-tailed fiscal, Lanius cabanisi
Yellow-billed shrike, Lanius corvinus
Magpie shrike, Lanius melanoleucus
Taita fiscal, Lanius dorsalis
Somali fiscal, Lanius somalicus
Mackinnon's shrike, Lanius mackinnoni
Northern fiscal, Lanius humeralis
Masked shrike, Lanius nubicus (A)
Woodchat shrike, Lanius senator
White-rumped shrike, Eurocephalus ruppelli

Crows, jays, and ravens

Order: PasseriformesFamily: Corvidae

The family Corvidae includes crows, ravens, jays, choughs, magpies, treepies, nutcrackers, and ground jays. Corvids are above average in size among the Passeriformes, and some of the larger species show high levels of intelligence.

Piapiac, Ptilostomus afer
House crow, Corvus splendens (I)
Cape crow, Corvus capensis
Pied crow, Corvus albus
Somali crow, Corvus edithae
Fan-tailed raven, Corvus rhipidurus
White-necked raven, Corvus albicollis

Hyliotas
Order: PasseriformesFamily: Hyliotidae

The members of this small family, all of genus Hyliota, are birds of the forest canopy. They tend to feed in mixed-species flocks.

Yellow-bellied hyliota, Hyliota flavigaster
Southern hyliota, Hyliota australis

Fairy flycatchers
Order: PasseriformesFamily: Stenostiridae

Most of the species of this small family are found in Africa, though a few inhabit tropical Asia. They are not closely related to other birds called "flycatchers".

African blue flycatcher, Elminia longicauda
Dusky crested-flycatcher, Elminia nigromitrata
White-tailed crested-flycatcher, Elminia albonotata

Tits, chickadees, and titmice
Order: PasseriformesFamily: Paridae

The Paridae are mainly small stocky woodland species with short stout bills. Some have crests. They are adaptable birds, with a mixed diet including seeds and insects.

White-shouldered black-tit, Melaniparus guineensis
White-bellied tit, Melaniparus albiventris
Dusky tit, Melaniparus funereus
Somali tit, Melaniparus thruppi
Red-throated tit, Melaniparus fringillinus

Penduline-tits
Order: PasseriformesFamily: Remizidae

The penduline tits are a group of small passerine birds related to the true tits. They are insectivores.

Mouse-colored penduline-tit, Anthoscopus musculus
African penduline-tit, Anthoscopus caroli

Larks

Order: PasseriformesFamily: Alaudidae

Larks are small terrestrial birds with often extravagant songs and display flights. Most larks are fairly dull in appearance. Their food is insects and seeds.

Chestnut-backed sparrow-lark, Eremopterix leucotis
Chestnut-headed sparrow-lark, Eremopterix signata
Fischer's sparrow-lark, Eremopterix leucopareia
Pink-breasted lark, Calendulauda poecilosterna
Fawn-colored lark, Calendulauda africanoides
Collared lark, Mirafra collaris
Red-winged lark, Mirafra hypermetra
Rufous-naped lark, Mirafra africana
Flappet lark, Mirafra rufocinnamomea
Williams's lark, Mirafra williamsi (E)
Friedmann's lark, Mirafra pulpa (Population data deficient)
White-tailed lark, Mirafra albicauda
Latakoo lark, Mirafra cheniana
Horsfield’s bushlark, Mirafra javanica
Gillett's lark, Mirafra gilletti
Red-capped lark, Calandrella cinerea
Greater short-toed lark, Alaudala brachydactyla (A) 
Somali short-toed lark, Alaudala somalica
Short-tailed lark, Spizocorys fremantlii
Masked lark, Spizocorys personata
Thekla's lark, Galerida theklae
Crested lark, Galerida cristata

Nicators
Order: PasseriformesFamily: Nicatoridae

The nicators are shrike-like, with hooked bills. They are endemic to sub-Saharan Africa.

Western nicator, Nicator chloris (A)
Eastern nicator, Nicator gularis

African warblers
Order: PasseriformesFamily: Macrosphenidae

African warblers are small to medium-sized insectivores which are found in a wide variety of habitats south of the Sahara.

Green crombec, Sylvietta virens
White-browed crombec, Sylvietta leucophrys
Northern crombec, Sylvietta brachyura
Red-faced crombec, Sylvietta whytii
Somali crombec, Sylvietta isabellina
Moustached grass-warbler, Melocichla mentalis
Kretschmer's longbill, Macrosphenus kretschmeri
Green hylia, Hylia prasina

Cisticolas and allies

Order: PasseriformesFamily: Cisticolidae

The Cisticolidae are warblers found mainly in warmer southern regions of the Old World. They are generally very small birds of drab brown or gray appearance found in open country such as grassland or scrub.

Yellow-vented eremomela, Eremomela flavicrissalis
Yellow-bellied eremomela, Eremomela icteropygialis
Green-backed eremomela, Eremomela canescens
Greencap eremomela, Eremomela scotops
Turner's eremomela, Eremomela turneri (Near-threatened)
White-chinned prinia, Schistolais leucopogon
Black-collared apalis, Oreolais pulcher
Miombo wren-warbler, Calamonastes undosus
Gray wren-warbler, Calamonastes simplex
Green-backed camaroptera, Camaroptera brachyura
Olive-green camaroptera, Camaroptera chloronota
Cricket longtail, Spiloptila clamans
Buff-bellied warbler, Phyllolais pulchella
Bar-throated apalis, Apalis thoracica
Taita apalis, Apalis fuscigularis (E) (Criticallty endangered)
Black-throated apalis, Apalis jacksoni
White-winged apalis, Apalis chariessa (Near-threatened)
Yellow-breasted apalis, Apalis flavida
Buff-throated apalis, Apalis rufogularis
Chestnut-throated apalis, Apalis porphyrolaema
Black-headed apalis, Apalis melanocephala
Gray apalis, Apalis cinerea
Brown-headed apalis, Apalis alticola
Karamoja apalis, Apalis karamojae (A) (Vulnerable)
Tawny-flanked prinia, Prinia subflava
Pale prinia, Prinia somalica
River prinia, Prinia fluviatilis (A)
Banded prinia, Prinia bairdii
Red-winged prinia, Prinia erythroptera
Red-fronted prinia, Prinia rufifrons
Black-faced rufous-warbler, Bathmocercus rufus
Gray-capped warbler, Eminia lepida
Red-faced cisticola, Cisticola erythrops
Singing cisticola, Cisticola cantans
Whistling cisticola, Cisticola lateralis
Trilling cisticola, Cisticola woosnami
Chubb's cisticola, Cisticola chubbi
Hunter's cisticola, Cisticola hunteri
Rock-loving cisticola, Cisticola aberrans
Boran cisticola, Cisticola bodessa
Rattling cisticola, Cisticola chiniana
Ashy cisticola, Cisticola cinereolus
Red-pate cisticola, Cisticola ruficeps
Wailing cisticola, Cisticola lais
Tana River cisticola, Cisticola restrictus (E) (Population data deficient)
Coastal cisticola, Cisticola haematocephalus
Winding cisticola, Cisticola marginatus
Rufous-winged cisticola, Cisticola galactotes
Carruthers's cisticola, Cisticola carruthersi
Levaillant's cisticola, Cisticola tinniens
Stout cisticola, Cisticola robustus
Croaking cisticola, Cisticola natalensis
Aberdare cisticola, Cisticola aberdare (E) (Vulnerable)
Tabora cisticola, Cisticola angusticaudus
Siffling cisticola, Cisticola brachypterus
Foxy cisticola, Cisticola troglodytes
Tiny cisticola, Cisticola nana
Zitting cisticola, Cisticola juncidis
Desert cisticola, Cisticola aridulus
Black-backed cisticola, Cisticola eximius
Pectoral-patch cisticola, Cisticola brunnescens
Wing-snapping cisticola, Cisticola ayresii

Reed warblers and allies

Order: PasseriformesFamily: Acrocephalidae

The members of this family are usually rather large for "warblers". Most are rather plain olivaceous brown above with much yellow to beige below. They are usually found in open woodland, reedbeds, or tall grass. The family occurs mostly in southern to western Eurasia and surroundings, but it also ranges far into the Pacific, with some species in  Africa.

Papyrus yellow-warbler, Calamonastides gracilirostris (Vulnerable)
Eastern olivaceous warbler, Iduna pallida
African yellow-warbler, Iduna natalensis
Mountain yellow-warbler, Iduna similis
Upcher's warbler, Hippolais languida
Olive-tree warbler, Hippolais olivetorum
Melodious warbler, Hippolais polyglotta (A)
Icterine warbler, Hippolais icterina
Sedge warbler, Acrocephalus schoenobaenus
Marsh warbler, Acrocephalus palustris
Common reed warbler, Acrocephalus scirpaceus
Basra reed warbler, Acrocephalus griseldis (Endangered)
Lesser swamp warbler, Acrocephalus gracilirostris
Greater swamp warbler, Acrocephalus rufescens
Great reed warbler, Acrocephalus arundinaceus

Grassbirds and allies
Order: PasseriformesFamily: Locustellidae

Locustellidae are a family of small insectivorous songbirds found mainly in Eurasia, Africa, and the Australian region. They are smallish birds with tails that are usually long and pointed, and tend to be drab brownish or buffy all over.

River warbler, Locustella fluviatilis
Savi's warbler, Locustella luscinioides (A)
Common grasshopper-warbler, Locustella naevia (A)
Fan-tailed grassbird, Catriscus brevirostris
Evergreen-forest warbler, Bradypterus lopezi
Cinnamon bracken-warbler, Bradypterus cinnamomeus
Little rush warbler, Bradypterus baboecala
White-winged swamp warbler, Bradypterus carpalis
Highland rush warbler, Bradypterus centralis

Swallows

Order: PasseriformesFamily: Hirundinidae

The family Hirundinidae is adapted to aerial feeding. They have a slender streamlined body, long pointed wings, and a short bill with a wide gape. The feet are adapted to perching rather than walking, and the front toes are partially joined at the base.

Plain martin, Riparia paludicola
Bank swallow, Riparia riparia
Banded martin, Neophedina cincta
Mascarene martin, Phedina borbonica (A)
Rock martin, Ptyonoprogne fuligula
Barn swallow, Hirundo rustica
Ethiopian swallow, Hirundo aethiopica
Angola swallow, Hirundo angolensis
Wire-tailed swallow, Hirundo smithii
Montane blue swallow, Hirundo atrocaerulea (Vulnerable)
Red-rumped swallow, Cecropis daurica
Lesser striped swallow, Cecropis abyssinica
Rufous-chested swallow, Cecropis semirufa
Mosque swallow, Cecropis senegalensis
South African swallow, Petrochelidon spilodera (A)
Common house-martin, Delichon urbicum
White-headed sawwing, Psalidoprocne albiceps
Black sawwing, Psalidoprocne pristoptera
Gray-rumped swallow, Pseudhirundo griseopyga

Bulbuls

Order: PasseriformesFamily: Pycnonotidae

Bulbuls are medium-sized songbirds. Some are colorful with yellow, red, or orange vents, cheeks, throats, or supercilia, but most are drab, with uniform olive-brown to black plumage. Some species have distinct crests.

Sombre greenbul, Andropadus importunus
Slender-billed greenbul, Stelgidillas gracilirostris
Red-tailed bristlebill, Bleda syndactylus
Lesser bristlebill, Bleda notatus (A)
Shelley's greenbul, Arizelocichla masukuensis
Eastern mountain greenbul, Arizelocichla nigriceps
Stripe-cheeked greenbul, Arizelocichla milanjensis
Yellow-bellied greenbul, Chlorocichla flaviventris
Joyful greenbul, Chlorocichla laetissima
Honeyguide greenbul, Baeopogon indicator
Yellow-throated greenbul, Atimastillas flavicollis
Red-tailed greenbul, Criniger calurus (A)
Gray greenbul, Eurillas gracilis
Ansorge's greenbul, Eurillas ansorgei
Plain greenbul, Eurillas curvirostris
Yellow-whiskered bulbul, Eurillas latirostris
Little greenbul, Eurillas virens
Terrestrial brownbul, Phyllastrephus terrestris
Northern brownbul, Phyllastrephus strepitans
Gray-olive greenbul, Phyllastrephus cerviniventris
Toro olive-greenbul, Phyllastrephus hypochloris
Fischer's greenbul, Phyllastrephus fischeri
Cabanis's greenbul, Phyllastrephus cabanisi
Yellow-streaked bulbul, Phyllastrephus flavostriatus (A) 
Tiny greenbul, Phyllastrephus debilis
Common bulbul, Pycnonotus barbatus

Leaf warblers
Order: PasseriformesFamily: Phylloscopidae

Leaf warblers are a family of small insectivorous birds found mostly in Eurasia and ranging into Wallacea and Africa. The species are of various sizes, often green-plumaged above and yellow below, or more subdued with grayish-green to grayish-brown colors.

Wood warbler, Phylloscopus sibilatrix
Willow warbler, Phylloscopus trochilus
Common chiffchaff, Phylloscopus collybita
Brown woodland-warbler, Phylloscopus umbrovirens
Yellow-throated woodland-warbler, Phylloscopus ruficapillus
Uganda woodland-warbler, Phylloscopus budongoensis

Bush warblers and allies
Order: PasseriformesFamily: Scotocercidae

The members of this family are found throughout Africa, Asia, and Polynesia. Their taxonomy is in flux, and some authorities place genus Erythrocerus in another family.

Yellow flycatcher, Erythrocercus holochlorus

Sylviid warblers, parrotbills, and allies
Order: PasseriformesFamily: Sylviidae

The family Sylviidae is a group of small insectivorous passerine birds. They mainly occur as breeding species, as the common name implies, in Europe, Asia, and, to a lesser extent, Africa. Most are of generally undistinguished appearance, but many have distinctive songs.

Eurasian blackcap, Sylvia atricapilla
Garden warbler, Sylvia borin
African hill babbler, Sylvia abyssinica
Barred warbler, Curruca nisoria
Banded parisoma, Curruca boehmi
Lesser whitethroat, Curruca curruca (A)
Brown parisoma, Curruca lugens
Greater whitethroat, Curruca communis

White-eyes, yuhinas, and allies

Order: PasseriformesFamily: Zosteropidae

The white-eyes are small and mostly undistinguished, their plumage above being generally some dull color like greenish-olive, but some species have a white or bright yellow throat, breast, or lower parts, and several have buff flanks. As their name suggests, many species have a white ring around each eye.

Pale white-eye, Zosterops flavilateralis
Mbulu white-eye, Zosterops mbuluensis
Green white-eye, Zosterops stuhlmanni
Kilimanjaro white-eye, Zosterops eurycricotus (A)
Heuglin's white-eye, Zosterops poliogastrus
Kikuyu white-eye, Zosterops kikuyuensis (E)
Taita white-eye, Zosterops silvanus (E) (Endangered)
Northern yellow white-eye, Zosterops senegalensis

Ground babblers and allies
Order: PasseriformesFamily: Pellorneidae

These small to medium-sized songbirds have soft fluffy plumage but are otherwise rather diverse. Members of the genus Illadopsis are found in forests, but some other genera are birds of scrublands.

Brown illadopsis, Illadopsis fulvescens
Pale-breasted illadopsis, Illadopsis rufipennis
Mountain illadopsis, Illadopsis pyrrhoptera
Scaly-breasted illadopsis, Illadopsis albipectus

Laughingthrushes and allies

Order: PasseriformesFamily: Leiothrichidae

The members of this family are diverse in size and coloration, though those of genus Turdoides tend to be brown or grayish. The family is found in Africa, India, and southeast Asia.

Rufous chatterer, Argya rubiginosa
Scaly chatterer, Argya aylmeri
Brown babbler, Turdoides plebejus
Hinde's pied-babbler, Turdoides hindei (E) (Vulnerable)
Scaly babbler, Turdoides squamulata
Arrow-marked babbler, Turdoides jardineii
Black-lored babbler, Turdoides sharpei
Northern pied-babbler, Turdoides hypoleuca

Treecreepers
Order: PasseriformesFamily: Certhiidae

Treecreepers are small woodland birds, brown above and white below. They have thin pointed down-curved bills which they use to extricate insects from bark. They have stiff tail feathers, like woodpeckers, which they use to support themselves on vertical trees.

African spotted creeper, Salpornis salvadori

Oxpeckers
Order: PasseriformesFamily: Buphagidae

As both the English and scientific names of these birds imply, they feed on ectoparasites, primarily ticks, found on large mammals.

Red-billed oxpecker, Buphagus erythrorynchus
Yellow-billed oxpecker, Buphagus africanus

Starlings

Order: PasseriformesFamily: Sturnidae

Starlings are small to medium-sized passerine birds. Their flight is strong and direct and they are very gregarious. Their preferred habitat is fairly open country. They eat insects and fruit. Plumage is typically dark with a metallic sheen.

Wattled starling, Creatophora cinerea
Rosy starling, Pastor roseus (A)
Violet-backed starling, Cinnyricinclus leucogaster
Slender-billed starling, Onychognathus tenuirostris
Neumann's starling, Onychognathus neumanni
Red-winged starling, Onychognathus morio
Waller's starling, Onychognathus walleri
Bristle-crowned starling, Onychognathus salvadorii
Magpie starling, Speculipastor bicolor
Sharpe's starling, Pholia sharpii
Abbott's starling, Poeoptera femoralis (Vulnerable)
Stuhlmann's starling, Poeoptera stuhlmanni
Kenrick's starling, Poeoptera kenricki
Black-bellied starling, Notopholia corusca
Hildebrandt's starling, Lamprotornis hildebrandti
Shelley's starling, Lamprotornis shelleyi
Rüppell's starling, Lamprotornis purpuroptera
Splendid starling, Lamprotornis splendidus
Golden-breasted starling, Lamprotornis regius
Superb starling, Lamprotornis superbus
White-crowned starling, Lamprotornis albicapillus
Fischer's starling, Lamprotornis fischeri
Lesser blue-eared starling, Lamprotornis chloropterus
Greater blue-eared starling, Lamprotornis chalybaeus
Purple starling, Lamprotornis purpureus
Bronze-tailed starling, Lamprotornis chalcurus

Thrushes and allies
Order: PasseriformesFamily: Turdidae

The thrushes are a group of passerine birds that occur mainly in the Old World. They are plump, soft plumaged, small to medium-sized insectivores or sometimes omnivores, often feeding on the ground. Many have attractive songs.

Red-tailed ant-thrush, Neocossyphus rufus
White-tailed ant-thrush, Neocossyphus poensis
Spotted ground-thrush, Geokichla guttata (Endangered)
Abyssinian ground-thrush, Geokichla piaggiae
Orange ground-thrush, Geokichla gurneyi
Abyssinian thrush, Turdus abyssinicus
Taita thrush, Turdus helleri (E) (Critically endangered)
African bare-eyed thrush, Turdus tephronotus
African thrush, Turdus pelios

Old World flycatchers

Order: PasseriformesFamily: Muscicapidae

Old World flycatchers are a large group of small passerine birds native to the Old World. They are mainly small arboreal insectivores. The appearance of these birds is highly varied, but they mostly have weak songs and harsh calls.

African dusky flycatcher, Muscicapa adusta
Spotted flycatcher, Muscicapa striata
Gambaga flycatcher, Muscicapa gambagae
Swamp flycatcher, Muscicapa aquatica
African gray flycatcher, Bradornis microrhynchus
Pale flycatcher, Agricola pallidus
Gray tit-flycatcher, Fraseria plumbea
Chapin's flycatcher, Fraseria lendu (Vulnerable)
Ashy flycatcher, Fraseria caerulescens
Silverbird, Empidornis semipartitus
Northern black-flycatcher, Melaenornis edolioides
Southern black-flycatcher, Melaenornis pammelaina
White-eyed slaty-flycatcher, Melaenornis fischeri
Bearded scrub-robin, Cercotrichas quadrivirgata
Rufous-tailed scrub-robin, Cercotrichas galactotes
Brown-backed scrub-robin, Cercotrichas hartlaubi
Red-backed scrub-robin, Cercotrichas leucophrys
Cape robin-chat, Cossypha caffra
Blue-shouldered robin-chat, Cossypha cyanocampter
Gray-winged robin-chat, Cossypha polioptera
Rüppell's robin-chat, Cossypha semirufa
White-browed robin-chat, Cossypha heuglini
Red-capped robin-chat, Cossypha natalensis
Snowy-crowned robin-chat, Cossypha niveicapilla
Collared palm-thrush, Cichladusa arquata
Spotted morning-thrush, Cichladusa guttata
White-starred robin, Pogonocichla stellata
Brown-chested alethe, Chamaetylas poliocephala
Yellow-breasted forest robin, Stiphrornis mabirae (A)
Equatorial akalat, Sheppardia aequatorialis
East coast akalat, Sheppardia gunningi (Near-threatened)
White-throated robin, Irania gutturalis
Thrush nightingale, Luscinia luscinia
Common nightingale, Luscinia megarhynchos
Semicollared flycatcher, Ficedula semitorquata
European pied flycatcher, Ficedula hypoleuca (A)
Collared flycatcher, Ficedula albicollis (A)
Common redstart, Phoenicurus phoenicurus
Little rock-thrush, Monticola rufocinereus
Rufous-tailed rock-thrush, Monticola saxatilis
Whinchat, Saxicola rubetra
African stonechat, Saxicola torquatus
Moorland chat, Pinarochroa sordida
Mocking cliff-chat, Thamnolaea cinnamomeiventris
Sooty chat, Myrmecocichla nigra
Northern anteater-chat, Myrmecocichla aethiops
Arnot's chat, Myrmecocichla arnotti (A)
Northern wheatear, Oenanthe oenanthe
Capped wheatear, Oenanthe pileata
Isabelline wheatear, Oenanthe isabellina
Heuglin's wheatear, Oenanthe heuglini
Desert wheatear, Oenanthe deserti (A)
Cyprus wheatear, Oenanthe cypriaca
Eastern black-eared wheatear, Oenanthe melanoleuca (A)
Pied wheatear, Oenanthe pleschanka
Familiar chat, Oenanthe familiaris
Brown-tailed chat, Oenanthe scotocerca
Abyssinian wheatear, Oenanthe lugubris
Mourning wheatear, Oenanthe lugens

Dapple-throat and allies
Order: PasseriformesFamily: Modulatricidae

This species and two others, all of different genera, were formerly placed in family Promeropidae, the sugarbirds, but were accorded their own family in 2017.

Gray-chested babbler, Kakamega poliothorax

Sunbirds and spiderhunters

Order: PasseriformesFamily: Nectariniidae

The sunbirds and spiderhunters are very small passerine birds which feed largely on nectar, although they will also take insects, especially when feeding young. Flight is fast and direct on their short wings. Most species can take nectar by hovering like a hummingbird, but usually perch to feed.

Plain-backed sunbird, Anthreptes reichenowi (Near-threatened)
Western violet-backed sunbird, Anthreptes longuemarei
Eastern violet-backed sunbird, Anthreptes orientalis
Uluguru violet-backed sunbird, Anthreptes neglectus
Green sunbird, Anthreptes rectirostris
Collared sunbird, Hedydipna collaris
Pygmy sunbird, Hedydipna platura
Amani sunbird, Hedydipna pallidigaster (Endangered)
Green-headed sunbird, Cyanomitra verticalis
Blue-throated brown sunbird, Cyanomitra cyanolaema
Olive sunbird, Cyanomitra olivacea
Mouse-colored sunbird, Cyanomitra veroxii
Green-throated sunbird, Chalcomitra rubescens
Amethyst sunbird, Chalcomitra amethystina
Scarlet-chested sunbird, Chalcomitra senegalensis
Hunter's sunbird, Chalcomitra hunteri
Tacazze sunbird, Nectarinia tacazze
Bronze sunbird, Nectarinia kilimensis
Malachite sunbird, Nectarinia famosa
Red-tufted sunbird, Nectarinia johnstoni
Golden-winged sunbird, Drepanorhynchus reichenowi
Olive-bellied sunbird, Cinnyris chloropygius
Northern double-collared sunbird, Cinnyris preussi
Eastern double-collared sunbird, Cinnyris mediocris
Usambara double-collared sunbird, Cinnyris usambaricus (Near-threatened)
Beautiful sunbird, Cinnyris pulchellus
Mariqua sunbird, Cinnyris mariquensis
Red-chested sunbird, Cinnyris erythrocerca
Black-bellied sunbird, Cinnyris nectarinioides
Purple-banded sunbird, Cinnyris bifasciatus
Tsavo sunbird, Cinnyris tsavoensis
Violet-breasted sunbird, Cinnyris chalcomelas
Orange-tufted sunbird, Cinnyris bouvieri
Shining sunbird, Cinnyris habessinicus
Superb sunbird, Cinnyris superbus
Variable sunbird, Cinnyris venustus
Copper sunbird, Cinnyris cupreus

Weavers and allies

Order: PasseriformesFamily: Ploceidae

The weavers are small passerine birds related to the finches. They are seed-eating birds with rounded conical bills. The males of many species are brightly colored, usually in red or yellow and black, though some species show variation in color only in the breeding season.

White-billed buffalo-weaver, Bubalornis albirostris
Red-billed buffalo-weaver, Bubalornis niger
White-headed buffalo-weaver, Dinemellia dinemelli
Speckle-fronted weaver, Sporopipes frontalis
White-browed sparrow-weaver, Plocepasser mahali
Chestnut-crowned sparrow-weaver, Plocepasser superciliosus
Donaldson-Smith's sparrow-weaver, Plocepasser donaldsoni
Rufous-tailed weaver, Histurgops ruficauda (A)
Gray-headed social-weaver, Pseudonigrita arnaudi
Black-capped social-weaver, Pseudonigrita cabanisi
Red-headed malimbe, Malimbus rubricollis
Red-headed weaver, Anaplectes rubriceps
Red weaver, Anaplectes jubaensis
Baglafecht weaver, Ploceus baglafecht
Little weaver, Ploceus luteolus
Slender-billed weaver, Ploceus pelzelni
Black-necked weaver, Ploceus nigricollis
Spectacled weaver, Ploceus ocularis
Black-billed weaver, Ploceus melanogaster
African golden-weaver, Ploceus subaureus
Holub's golden-weaver, Ploceus xanthops
Orange weaver, Ploceus aurantius (A)
Golden palm weaver, Ploceus bojeri
Taveta golden-weaver, Ploceus castaneiceps
Northern brown-throated weaver, Ploceus castanops
Northern masked-weaver, Ploceus taeniopterus
Lesser masked-weaver, Ploceus intermedius
Vitelline masked-weaver, Ploceus vitellinus
Heuglin's masked-weaver, Ploceus heuglini
Rüppell's weaver, Ploceus galbula (A)
Speke's weaver, Ploceus spekei
Vieillot's black weaver, Ploceus nigerrimus
Village weaver, Ploceus cucullatus
Weyns's weaver, Ploceus weynsi (A)
Clarke's weaver, Ploceus golandi (E) (Endangered)
Salvadori's weaver, Ploceus dichrocephalus
Black-headed weaver, Ploceus melanocephalus
Golden-backed weaver, Ploceus jacksoni
Chestnut weaver, Ploceus rubiginosus
Forest weaver, Ploceus bicolor
Brown-capped weaver, Ploceus insignis
Compact weaver, Pachyphantes superciliosus
Cardinal quelea, Quelea cardinalis
Red-headed quelea, Quelea erythrops
Red-billed quelea, Quelea quelea
Northern red bishop, Euplectes franciscanus
Southern red bishop, Euplectes orix
Zanzibar red bishop, Euplectes nigroventris
Black-winged bishop, Euplectes hordeaceus
Black bishop, Euplectes gierowii
Yellow-crowned bishop, Euplectes afer
Fire-fronted bishop, Euplectes diadematus
Yellow bishop, Euplectes capensis
White-winged widowbird, Euplectes albonotatus
Yellow-mantled widowbird, Euplectes macroura
Red-collared widowbird, Euplectes ardens
Red-cowled widowbird, Euplectes laticauda
Fan-tailed widowbird, Euplectes axillaris
Marsh widowbird, Euplectes hartlaubi
Long-tailed widowbird, Euplectes progne
Jackson's widowbird, Euplectes jacksoni (Near-threatened)
Grosbeak weaver, Amblyospiza albifrons

Waxbills and allies

Order: PasseriformesFamily: Estrildidae

The estrildid finches are small passerine birds of the Old World tropics and Australasia. They are gregarious and often colonial seed eaters with short, thick but pointed bills. They are similar in structure and habits, but have wide variation in plumage colors and patterns.

Gray-headed silverbill, Spermestes griseicapilla
Bronze mannikin, Spermestes cucullata
Magpie mannikin, Spermestes fringilloides (A)
Black-and-white mannikin, Spermestes bicolor
African silverbill, Euodice cantans
Yellow-bellied waxbill, Coccopygia quartinia
Green-backed twinspot, Mandingoa nitidula
Abyssinian crimsonwing, Cryptospiza salvadorii
White-breasted nigrita, Nigrita fusconotus
Chestnut-breasted nigrita, Nigrita bicolor
Gray-headed nigrita, Nigrita canicapillus
Black-faced waxbill, Brunhilda erythronotos
Black-cheeked waxbill, Brunhilda charmosyna
Black-crowned waxbill, Estrilda nonnula
Kandt's waxbill, Estrilda kandti
Fawn-breasted waxbill, Estrilda paludicola
Common waxbill, Estrilda astrild
Black-rumped waxbill, Estrilda troglodytes
Crimson-rumped waxbill, Estrilda rhodopyga
Quailfinch, Ortygospiza fuscocrissa
Locustfinch, Paludipasser locustella
Cut-throat, Amadina fasciata
Zebra waxbill, Amandava subflava
Purple grenadier, Granatina ianthinogaster
Southern cordonbleu, Uraeginthus angolensis (A)
Red-cheeked cordonbleu, Uraeginthus bengalus
Blue-capped cordonbleu, Uraeginthus cyanocephalus
Red-headed bluebill, Spermophaga ruficapilla
Black-bellied seedcracker, Pyrenestes ostrinus
Green-winged pytilia, Pytilia melba
Orange-winged pytilia, Pytilia afra
Peters's twinspot, Hypargos niveoguttatus
Brown twinspot, Clytospiza monteiri
Red-billed firefinch, Lagonosticta senegala
African firefinch, Lagonosticta rubricata
Jameson's firefinch, Lagonosticta rhodopareia
Black-bellied firefinch, Lagonosticta rara
Bar-breasted firefinch, Lagonosticta rufopicta
Black-faced firefinch, Lagonosticta larvata

Indigobirds

Order: PasseriformesFamily: Viduidae

The indigobirds are finch-like species which usually have black or indigo predominating in their plumage. All are brood parasites, which lay their eggs in the nests of estrildid finches.

Pin-tailed whydah, Vidua macroura
Broad-tailed paradise-whydah, Vidua obtusa (A)
Eastern paradise-whydah, Vidua paradisaea
Steel-blue whydah, Vidua hypocherina
Straw-tailed whydah, Vidua fischeri
Village indigobird, Vidua chalybeata
Variable indigobird, Vidua funerea
Purple indigobird, Vidua purpurascens
Parasitic weaver, Anomalospiza imberbis

Old World sparrows

Order: PasseriformesFamily: Passeridae

Sparrows are small passerine birds. In general, sparrows tend to be small, plump, brown or gray birds with short tails and short powerful beaks. Sparrows are seed eaters, but they also consume small insects.

House sparrow, Passer domesticus (I)
Somali sparrow, Passer castanopterus
Kenya rufous sparrow, Passer rufocinctus
Shelley's rufous sparrow, Passer shelleyi
Northern gray-headed sparrow, Passer griseus
Swainson's sparrow, Passer swainsonii
Parrot-billed sparrow, Passer gongonensis
Swahili sparrow, Passer suahelicus
Chestnut sparrow, Passer eminibey
Yellow-spotted bush sparrow, Gymnoris pyrgita

Wagtails and pipits

Order: PasseriformesFamily: Motacillidae

Motacillidae is a family of small passerine birds with medium to long tails. They include the wagtails, longclaws, and pipits. They are slender ground-feeding insectivores of open country.

Cape wagtail, Motacilla capensis
Mountain wagtail, Motacilla clara
Gray wagtail, Motacilla cinerea
Western yellow wagtail, Motacilla flava
African pied wagtail, Motacilla aguimp
White wagtail, Motacilla alba
African pipit, Anthus cinnamomeus
Long-billed pipit, Anthus similis
Tawny pipit, Anthus campestris 
Plain-backed pipit, Anthus leucophrys
Buffy pipit, Anthus vaalensis
Malindi pipit, Anthus melindae
Striped pipit, Anthus lineiventris
Tree pipit, Anthus trivialis
Red-throated pipit, Anthus cervinus
Bush pipit, Anthus caffer
Sokoke pipit, Anthus sokokensis (Endangered)
Golden pipit, Tmetothylacus tenellus
Sharpe's longclaw, Hemimacronyx sharpei (E) (Endangered)
Yellow-throated longclaw, Macronyx croceus
Pangani longclaw, Macronyx aurantiigula
Rosy-throated longclaw, Macronyx ameliae

Finches, euphonias, and allies

Order: PasseriformesFamily: Fringillidae

Finches are seed-eating passerine birds that are small to moderately large and have a strong beak, usually conical and in some species very large. All have twelve tail feathers and nine primaries. These birds have a bouncing flight with alternating bouts of flapping and gliding on closed wings, and most sing well.

Oriole finch, Linurgus olivaceus
Yellow-fronted canary, Crithagra mozambica
African citril, Crithagra citrinelloides
Western citril, Crithagra frontalis (A)
Southern citril, Crithagra hyposticta
Papyrus canary, Crithagra koliensis
Black-throated canary, Crithagra atrogularis
Reichenow's seedeater, Crithagra reichenowi
White-bellied canary, Crithagra dorsostriata
Northern grosbeak-canary, Crithagra donaldsoni
Southern grosbeak-canary, Crithagra buchanani
Brimstone canary, Crithagra sulphurata
Streaky seedeater, Crithagra striolata
Thick-billed seedeater, Crithagra burtoni
West African seedeater, Crithagra canicapilla
Reichard's seedeater, Crithagra reichardi
Yellow-crowned canary, Serinus flavivertex

Old World buntings
Order: PasseriformesFamily: Emberizidae

The emberizids are a large family of passerine birds. They are seed-eating birds with distinctively shaped bills. Many emberizid species have distinctive head patterns.

Brown-rumped bunting, Emberiza affinis (A)
Ortolan bunting, Emberiza hortulana (A)
Golden-breasted bunting, Emberiza flaviventris
Somali bunting, Emberiza poliopleura
Cinnamon-breasted bunting, Emberiza tahapisi
Gosling's bunting, Emberiza goslingi (A)
Striolated bunting, Emberiza striolata

See also
List of birds
Lists of birds by region

References

External links
Birds of Kenya - World Institute for Conservation and Environment

Kenya
Kenya
Birds
Kenya